Wurmbea is a genus of perennial herbs in the family Colchicaceae, native to Africa and Australia. There are about 50 species, with about half endemic to each continent.

Recently the circumscription of the genus Wurmbea has been increased to include Onixotis punctata and Onixotis stricta.

African species accepted by the World Checklist of Selected Plant Families  are:

Australian species accepted by the World Checklist of Selected Plant Families  are:

References
Notes

Sources
 

 
Colchicaceae genera
Taxa named by Carl Peter Thunberg